Mark Edmondson defeated the defending champion John Newcombe in the final, 6–7, 6–3, 7–6, 6–1 to win the men's singles tennis title at the 1976 Australian Open. Unseeded at the tournament and ranked world No. 212 at the time, Edmondson remains the lowest ranked player ever to win a major since rankings were introduced in 1973. Edmondson is also the most recent Australian to win the Australian Open men's singles title.

Seeds
The seeded players are listed below. Mark Edmondson is the champion; others show the round in which they were eliminated.

   Ken Rosewall (semifinals)
   John Newcombe (final)
   Tony Roche (quarterfinals)
   Stan Smith (third round)
   Phil Dent (second round)
   Geoff Masters (second round)
   Ross Case (quarterfinals)
   Allan Stone (second round)
   Bob Carmichael (first round)
   Charlie Pasarell (third round)
   Ray Ruffels (semifinals)
   Brian Fairlie (third round)
   Dick Crealy (quarterfinals)
   Kim Warwick (third round)
   Ray Moore (third round)
   Syd Ball (third round)

Draw

Final eight

Section 1

Section 2

Section 3

Section 4

External links
 Association of Tennis Professionals (ATP) – 1976 Australian Open Men's Singles draw
 1976 Australian Open – Men's draws and results at the International Tennis Federation

Mens singles
Australian Open (tennis) by year – Men's singles